Kitamoto (written: 北本) is a Japanese surname. Notable people with the surname include:

, Japanese women's footballer
, Japanese footballer
, Japanese long-distance runner
, Japanese sprint canoeist

Japanese-language surnames